The 2005 Sultan Azlan Shah Cup was the 14th edition of field hockey tournament the Sultan Azlan Shah Cup.

Participating nations
Seven countries participated in the tournament:

Fixtures and results
All times are Malaysia Standard Time (UTC+08:00)

Preliminary round

Fixtures

Classification round

Fifth and sixth place

Third and fourth place

Final

Statistics

Final standings

Goalscorers

References

External links
Official website

2005 in field hockey
2005
2005 in Malaysian sport
2005 in South Korean sport
2005 in Australian field hockey
2005 in New Zealand sport
2005 in South African sport
2005 in Pakistani sport
2005 in Indian sport